The Riot Compensation Act 2016 (c. 8) is an Act of the Parliament of the United Kingdom that repeals the Riot (Damages) Act 1886 and modernizes the procedures for the payment of compensation to persons whose property has been injured, destroyed or stolen during a riot.

It arose as a ballot bill sponsored by Mike Wood MP, following Government review and consultations on the subject, and it received Home Office support to expedite its passage.

Background
As a result of the 2011 England riots, significant problems were exposed concerning the administration of claims intended to be indemnified under the scheme established under the Riot (Damages) Act 1886. An independent review of the Act reported in 2013 that:

 the language of the Act needed to be modernized;
 compensation payable to insurers should be capped;
 it should be extended to cover other types of property such as motor vehicles;
 it should be based on the replacement value of the property damaged, but not include any consequential loss;
 the Home Office should work with the insurance industry to improve claims administration; and
 interim payments should be made available with respect to claims.

Following a round of public consultations, the Government broadly accepted the reviewer's recommendations, including extending limited compensation for damage to motor vehicles whose policies do not have coverage for riot damages, and further specified that the statutory definition for a riot should be drawn from the Public Order Act 1986.

The implementing bill was introduced on 24 June 2015, and received royal assent on 23 March 2016.

Significant changes
The Act introduces several key changes, including:

 allowing insurers who have met claims from people or businesses to claim compensation from the local policing body:
 allowing people and businesses, which are not insured, to claim compensation from the local policing body;
 requiring that the amount of compensation must reflect only the loss directly resulting from the damage, destruction or theft of the property, and in particular, must not reflect any consequential loss resulting from it;
 ending unlimited compensation, setting a £1m cap on each claim; and
 allowing for claims on motor vehicles which are not insured for riot damage, but which are covered by an insurance policy at the time.

Coming into force
Authority for making necessary regulations by way of statutory instrument came into effect on royal assent. The remainder of the Act took effect on 6 April 2017.

Further reading

Notes

References

External links

 

United Kingdom Acts of Parliament 2016